The 2012 Connecticut Huskies football team represented the University of Connecticut in the 2012 NCAA Division I FBS football season as a member of the Big East Conference. The team was led by second year head coach Paul Pasqualoni and played its home games at Rentschler Field in East Hartford, Connecticut. They finished the season 5–7, 2–5 in Big East play to finish in a tie for sixth place.

Schedule

References

Connecticut
UConn Huskies football seasons
Connecticut Huskies football